Melitaea aurelia, or Nickerl's fritillary, is a butterfly of the family Nymphalidae. It is found in central Europe.

Description 
The wingspan is 28–32 mm. Dark russet-brown, so strongly marked with black that the ground-colour is reduced in the female to very small spots. On the whole similar to Melitaea athalia, but smaller, with the black markings deeper in tint and heavier, the ground-colour darker, more brownish; beneath the marginal line before the fringes is absent or but very indistinct. The species is recognizable by the palpi bearing foxy red hairs, while the palpi of athalia are whitish, being occasionally somewhat reddish yellow and then only at the base.

Biology 
The butterfly flies from June to August depending on the location.
The larvae feed on Plantago lanceolata, Melampyrum pratense and yellow rattle.

References

External links
Butterflies of Europe 
Lepidoptera of Belgium

Melitaea
Butterflies of Europe